"I Want You" is a song by the American rock band Cheap Trick, which was released in 1982 as the second single from their sixth studio album One on One. The song was written by Rick Nielsen and produced by Roy Thomas Baker. It was released as a single in the Netherlands only, reaching No. 48 there.

Despite the title's similarity to Cheap Trick's popular song "I Want You to Want Me", the song is not similar in any other way. No music video was created to promote the single. The single's B-side, "Lookin' Out for Number One", also appeared on One on One.

Critical reception
In a review of One on One, Christopher Connelly of Rolling Stone singled out the song as one of the album's "depressingly moronic cuts". He commented: "Robin Zander sounds as though he's undergoing total body electrolysis. His hollering is abetted by Nielsen's ultravolume ax thrashings and Roy Thomas Baker's acquiescent production. Not even the solid rhythm section of Bun E. Carlos and new bassist Jon Brant stands a chance against that kind of aural firepower."

Track listing
7" Single
"I Want You" - 3:30
"Lookin' Out for Number One" - 4:14

Chart performance

Personnel
Cheap Trick
 Robin Zander - lead vocals, rhythm guitar
 Rick Nielsen - lead guitar, backing vocals
 Jon Brant - bass, backing vocals
 Bun E. Carlos - drums, percussion

Additional personnel
 Roy Thomas Baker - producer
 Ian Taylor – engineer
 Paul Klingberg – assistant
 George Marino – mastering

References

1982 singles
Cheap Trick songs
Song recordings produced by Roy Thomas Baker
Epic Records singles
1982 songs
Songs written by Rick Nielsen